Rural Township is a township in Jefferson County, Kansas, USA.  It was formed in 1871, from the territory of Kentucky Township and Sarcoxie Township.  As of the 2000 census, its population was 804.

Geography
Rural Township covers an area of 32.19 square miles (83.37 square kilometers); of this, 0.37 square miles (0.95 square kilometers) or 1.14 percent is water. The streams of Buck Creek, East Stone House Creek, Stone Horse Creek and West Stone House Creek run through this township.

Unincorporated towns
 Buck Creek
 Williamstown
(This list is based on USGS data and may include former settlements.)

Adjacent townships
 Oskaloosa Township (north)
 Sarcoxie Township (east)
 Grant Township, Douglas County (southeast)
 Wakarusa Township, Douglas County (south)
 Lecompton Township, Douglas County (southwest)
 Kentucky Township (west)

Cemeteries
The township contains three cemeteries: Buster, Holliday and Underwood.

Major highways
 U.S. Route 24
 U.S. Route 24, 59
 U.S. Route 59

References
 U.S. Board on Geographic Names (GNIS)
 United States Census Bureau cartographic boundary files

External links
 US-Counties.com
 City-Data.com

Townships in Jefferson County, Kansas
Townships in Kansas